Atticus may refer to:

Atticus, an adjective Latin name meaning "Athenian" or "of Attica"

People 
 Titus Pomponius Atticus (112/109 – 35/32 BC), ancient Roman littérateur, philosopher, and correspondent with Cicero
 Herodes Atticus (101–177), Greek rhetorician
 Atticus (philosopher) (fl. c. 175), Platonist philosopher and author of lost Plato commentary
 Atticus, Christian martyr, one of Agapius, Atticus, Carterius, Styriacus, Tobias, Eudoxius, Nictopolion, and Companions (d. 310)
 Atticus of Constantinople (406–425) 
 Atticus Greene Haygood (1839–1896), Methodist bishop and president of Emory University
 Atticus Ross (born 1968), English musician
 Atticus Browne (born 1991), West Indian cricketer
 Atticus Mitchell (born 1993), Canadian actor and musician
 Atticus Shaffer (born 1998), American actor
 Atticus (poet), pseudonymous Canadian poet

Fictional people 
 Atticus, a character in Cicero's De Legibus
 Atticus, a character in The 39 Clues series of young adult novels
 Atticus Aldridge, a character in the television series Downton Abbey
 Atticus Fetch, a character in the television series Californication
 Atticus Finch, a central character in the novel To Kill a Mockingbird
 Atticus Kodiak, a character in novels by Greg Rucka
 Sir Atticus Moon, a character in Big Time Movie
 Atticus Murphy Jr., a character in the television series Todd and the Book of Pure Evil
 Atticus O'Sullivan, the main character of the novel series The Iron Druid Chronicles
 Atticus Rhodes, a character in the English dub of the Japanese anime Yu-Gi-Oh! GX
 Atticus Lincoln, a character in the television series Grey's Anatomy
 Atticus Turner, a character in the novel Lovecraft Country
 Atticus Freeman, a character in the television series Lovecraft Country
 Atticus Busby, a character in the Australian the television series Little Lunch
 Atticus King, a character in the comic series King of Spies by Mark Millar

Other 
 Atticus (band), an alternative rock band from Knoxville, Tennessee
 Atticus (novel), a 1996 novel by Ron Hansen
 Atticus Circle, non-profit organization advocating for LGBT issues in Texas
 Atticus Clothing, clothing line developed by musicians
 Atticus the Storyteller's 100 Greek Myths, collection of Greek mythology by Lucy Coats
 Atticus, part of the tympanic cavity of the middle ear
Atticus (given name)